Sir John Gielgud, OM, CH (1904–2000) was an English actor and theatre director. He appeared on stage, television and radio and in film in a career that spanned eight decades. Film historian Brian McFarlane, writing for the British Film Institute, wrote of Gielgud that "in terms of the performing arts, it is no exaggeration to say that he towered over the century".

Gielgud, a member of the theatrical dynasty the Terry family, began working on stage in 1921 before attending the Royal Academy of Dramatic Art. After completing his studies he worked in repertory theatre and in the West End before establishing himself at the Old Vic in the 1930s. He continued working on the stage until 1990 both as a director and actor. Although he made some films early in his career, he did not start working regularly in the medium until he was in his sixties; in the course of just over thirty years between 1964 and 1998 he appeared in over sixty films. He was active on television and radio, appearing in numerous plays and interviews, and was also in demand as a narrator.

Gielgud is one of the few people who have won all four major annual American entertainment awards, these being an Oscar (for Arthur, 1981); an Emmy, (for Summer's Lease, 1991); a Grammy (for Ages of Man, 1979); and Tony Awards (for The Importance of Being Earnest, 1948; Ages of Man, 1959; Big Fish, Little Fish, 1961).  He also won BAFTAs, (for Julius Caesar, 1953; Murder on the Orient Express, 1975; special Fellowship award, 1992);  Golden Globes, (for Arthur and War and Remembrance, 1988); and a Laurence Olivier Award (Special Award, 1985). He died on 21 May 2000, at the age of 96.

Stage credits

As actor
This table contains Gielgud's known professional theatrical roles. It also contains the occasions when he both acted and directed. It does not contain those productions where Gielgud was a director but did not appear on stage.

As director

This table contains Gielgud's stage work as a director. It does not include those productions in which he also appeared, which are shown in the table above.

Radio plays

Gielgud took part in numerous radio broadcasts in his career, including interviews, poetry readings and talks about the theatre and acting. The following is a list of plays in which he was involved.

Filmography

Television

Awards and honours

Notes and references
Notes

References

Bibliography

External links

 
 
 
 
 
 John Gielgud on Pathé News

Male actor filmographies
British filmographies